Maria Constantinescu may refer to:
 Maria Constantinescu (handballer)
 Maria Constantinescu (rower)